"Lose Yourself" is a song by American rapper Eminem from the soundtrack to the 2002 motion picture 8 Mile. The song was composed and produced by Eminem, longtime collaborator Jeff Bass, one half of the production duo Bass Brothers and Luis Resto. The lyrics were written by Eminem. It was released on October 28, 2002, as the lead single from the soundtrack. The song's lyrics explicitly sum up the background of Eminem's character in 8 Mile, B-Rabbit, with the first verse summing up much of the plot of the movie. The song incorporates several aggressive themes, largely dealing with the struggles dealt with by B-Rabbit, and how he eventually overcomes his many problems and obstacles to gain the respect of other rappers.

"Lose Yourself" was a commercial success, becoming Eminem's first Billboard Hot 100 number-one single and remaining there for twelve consecutive weeks. It reached atop of the charts in nineteen other countries. "Lose Yourself" received acclaim from music critics, with many critics praising the song's inspiring, aggressive themes and describing it as Eminem's best work to date. Eminem's rapping ability, the lyrics and the production were also praised. In many retrospective reviews and lists, critics have cited the song among Eminem's finest, as well as one of the greatest hip hop songs of all time.

The music video for the song, directed by Eminem, manager Paul Rosenberg and Phillip G. Atwell, was released on October 7, 2002. The video is a mixture of multiple scenarios, including scenes from and reminiscent of the movie 8 Mile, and Eminem rapping next to the "8 Mile Rd. Mobile Court" sign that appears on the cover of the movie's soundtrack. It received the MTV Video Music Award for Best Video from a Film.

"Lose Yourself" won the Academy Award for Best Original Song, making it the first hip hop song to receive the award, and also won the Grammy Award for Best Rap Song and Best Rap Solo Performance. In 2004, it was one of only three rap songs from the 21st century to be included on Rolling Stones list of the 500 Greatest Songs of All Time, being the highest ranked at number 166. Rolling Stone also included it on its list of the Top 50 Hip Hop Songs of All Time. "Lose Yourself" is certified Diamond by the Recording Industry Association of America (RIAA), and has been downloaded 10 million times in the United States alone. It is also the most streamed song on Spotify from the 2000s. Eminem performed the song alongside fellow American rapper Anderson .Paak (on drums) in the Super Bowl LVI halftime show on February 13, 2022.

Background
Eminem says that "Lose Yourself" was written on set, during breaks while filming 8 Mile. Taryn Manning, who played Jimmy's ex-girlfriend Janeane in 8 Mile, said in an interview with MTV, that during the filming of the movie, in any downtime, Eminem was writing and that "you could just see him formulating stuff in his head." According to studio engineer Steven King, who spoke to Rolling Stone magazine, Eminem recorded the song in a portable studio on the set while he was on a break from shooting, using only one take for each verse. The sheet on which he wrote the song appears in 8 Mile in a scene where his character is writing while riding the bus.

The official demo version of this song, titled "Lose Yourself (Demo Version)" with two different verses and a slightly different hook, was released on the album Shady XV November 24, 2014. A Drum & Bass remix has been made and was released on the mixtape Straight from the Lab as a European bonus track.

Composition
"Lose Yourself" is a mid-tempo hip hop track with an urgent narrative delivery. The song's lyrics explicitly sum up the background of Eminem's character in 8 Mile, B-Rabbit, with the first verse summing up much of the plot of the movie. The song incorporates several aggressive themes, largely dealing with the struggles dealt with by B-Rabbit, and how he eventually overcomes his many problems and obstacles to gain the respect of other rappers.

The song's production incorporates piano, drums, violins, and several other string instruments. The song is one of four new Eminem solo songs on the soundtrack, the other three being "8 Mile", "Rabbit Run" and "Stimulate" (included on deluxe edition only). Several critics cited this trio of songs as the best three from the soundtrack, as well as the most aggressive songs Eminem ever recorded. Piano chords described as "instantly recognizable" open the song. Throughout the song there is a "tense, unrelenting guitar lick". The song is in the key of D minor.

Critical reception
"Lose Yourself" received widespread critical acclaim, with many critics praising the song's aggressive themes and describing it as Eminem's best work to date. Eminem's rapping ability, the lyrics and the production were also praised as well. In many retrospective reviews and lists, critics have cited the song among Eminem's finest, as well as one of the greatest hip-hop songs of all time. AllMusic editor Stephen Thomas Erlewine praised the song's production: "The opening track and first single [from the 8 Mile soundtrack] "Lose Yourself" is easily equaled by the title song with its layered pianos" and he highlighted it.

NME was extremely positive: "Eminem's urgent radio hit 'Lose Yourself', you already know. It's excellent, if obviously an offcut from 'The Eminem Show', all thundering rawk guitars and Rocky-ish bassline (appropriately enough)." RapReviews also noted: "And as all great journeys begin with a single step, so too does Eminem with this album's opening song AND lead single entitled "Lose Yourself". 411 Mania praised the song: "The album wastes no time, delivering the hit 'Lose Yourself' as the first track. The song is as close to a ballad as Eminem will ever get. It is a very hot, adrenaline-laced track. It also continues Eminem's recent trend of putting out tracks with more of a meaning."

Chart performance
In the United States, "Lose Yourself" debuted on the Billboard Hot 100 singles chart the week of October 5, 2002, at No. 43 prior to its release 24 days later, which is October 28 of that same year. A week later, the single jumped to No. 18, and hit No. 1 on the week of November 9 and remained there for twelve consecutive weeks until it was knocked off by Bump, Bump, Bump by B2K and P. Diddy. The single spent 16 total weeks in the Top 10, and a total of 23 weeks in the Top 50. While in the No. 1 spot (from November 9, 2002, through January 25, 2003), "Lose Yourself" kept several top contenders for the No. 1 spot from ever reaching No. 1, including Jay-Z, Nelly, Jennifer Lopez, Christina Aguilera, and especially Missy Elliott, whose single "Work It" was at No. 2 for 10 weeks. The song also topped the Pop Songs chart for 7 weeks and hit No. 4 and No. 2 on the Hot R&B/Hip-Hop Songs and Rap Songs charts. The song also used some rock music origins allowing moderate success to alternative rock radio peaking No. 14 on the Modern Rock Tracks chart, the rapper's only song to chart.

In France, it is the 53rd-best-selling single of the 21st century, with 386,000 units sold . By December 2016, it had sold more than 11,590,000 units worldwide.

, it has sold 10 million copies in the U.S. and has been certified Diamond.

Following the performance of the song by Eminem and Anderson .Paak in the Super Bowl LVI halftime show on February 13, 2022, the song re-entered on the Billboard Hot 100 upon the issue date of February 26, 2022 for its further stay for a total of 24 weeks.

Music video

The song's accompanying music video, directed by Eminem, manager Paul Rosenberg and Phillip G. Atwell, was released on October 7, 2002. It was uploaded unofficially on YouTube by msvogue23 on August 6, 2015. The video is a mixture of several scenarios, largely including several scenes from 8 Mile; however, it also contains scenes addressing problems the real-life Eminem has addressed, as well as "B-Rabbit"'s difficulties, including the ostracism by rap communities towards him due to his color and his difficult personal life.

The music video for "Lose Yourself" was filmed in Detroit, Michigan, and thus contains numerous shots of the city, including the Ambassador Bridge. The video is a mixture of multiple scenarios, including scenes from and reminiscent of the movie 8 Mile, and Eminem rapping next to the "8 Mile Rd. Mobile Court" sign that appears on the cover of the movie's soundtrack.

It contains scenes focusing on both Rabbit's and the real-life Eminem's character; for example, the interpersonal difficulties he has to face while rapping, the insults and booing of crowds due to being a white rapper in a black-dominate scene, the domestic trouble he has to overcome due to his alcoholic mother and her deadbeat boyfriend, and dealing with the problems that arise from the people he associates with.

At the 2003 MTV Video Music Awards it received the award for Best Video from a Film in the final year this award was given out. It also received nominations for Video of the Year, Best Male Video, Best Rap Video, and Viewer's Choice. He won a MuchMusic Video Award in 2003 for Favorite International Artist with the video for "Lose Yourself".

As of March 2023, a fan-edit video has more than 1.28 billion views on YouTube. This makes it one of the top 300 most viewed videos on the website. The original music video was originally uploaded by Eminem's official account, but it was indirectly blocked from UMG. The copyright claim block has since been lifted and it has been made available to watch since 2020.

Legacy
While not Eminem's best-selling single, "Lose Yourself" is considered by many to be his signature song. Upon its release, the track was a worldwide chart success, peaking at number one on 24 national charts worldwide. These included the US Billboard Hot 100, making it Eminem's first number-one hit in the United States. It had a 12-week run at No. 1 in the United States and Australia, and it topped the charts in many other countries, including United Kingdom, Ireland, New Zealand and Denmark. It debuted at number nine in Canada and moved up to #1 the following week. According to the Guinness Book of World Records, "Lose Yourself" became the "Longest-Running Single at Number One for a Rap Song", at 23 weeks. With over 19 million copies sold in the United States, it is Eminem's third-best-selling song, just behind "Love the Way You Lie" and "Not Afraid".

The song went on to receive the Academy Award for Best Original Song (the first time a rap song ever won this award), beating other nominees like U2's "The Hands That Built America." Eminem, who was not present at the award ceremony as he believed he would not win, said in a Shade 45 Behind the Boards interview with Cipha Sounds that he was actually sleeping, with cartoons on for his daughter, at the time the award was announced. This was the first time in 14 years the winner of the Best Original Song category did not perform at the ceremony. Luis Resto, one of the song's co-producers, had attended the ceremony and accepted the award on his behalf. "He's creative, he has symphonies in his head," Resto said at the lectern about Eminem. Mathers denied his absence was due to objections the show's producers had with the song's profanity. Eminem would later perform verses 1 and 3 of the uncensored song at a special performance during the 92nd Academy Awards in 2020, 17 years after he won the award, with brief moments of silence in the show's telecast. The American Film Institute later ranked it #93 on their list of the 100 Greatest Songs from American Films.

At the 46th Annual Grammy Awards, "Lose Yourself" became Eminem's second career nomination for Record of the Year (following "Without Me"), and it was the first rap song ever to be nominated for Song of the Year. It won Best Male Rap Solo Performance and Best Rap Song, which was a new category at the time.

At No. 166, "Lose Yourself" is the highest-ranked of the three songs from the 21st century featured in the 2004 List of Rolling Stones 500 Greatest Songs of All Time (joining "Stan" at No. 290 and Outkast's "Hey Ya!" at No. 180), although it was dropped from the 2010 update but later reinstated to 167 in the 2021 version. The magazine later ranked the song the twelfth-best of the 2000s decade. The song was the 51st best-selling single of the 2000s decade in the United Kingdom. The song was placed at number 104 by Pitchfork on their list of "The Top 500 Tracks of the 2000s".

In October 2011, NME placed it at number 57 on its list "150 Best Tracks of the Past 15 Years". VH1 placed it at #4 for the best songs of the 2000s. In April 2016, it was placed at number 28 by Rolling Stone on their list of "100 Greatest Hip-hop songs of all time".

The song continued to be prominent in 2020 and beyond. In an analysis of over 30,000 songs on Spotify, "Lose Yourself" was in the top 10 most popular songs on running playlists along with one of the most popular songs of the year in which the data was analyzed—"Blinding Lights" by The Weeknd—which also shares its tempo at 171 beats per minute. The song was also used by President Joe Biden for his 2020 presidential campaign. Mathers, who endorsed Biden in his election campaign, gave his consent for Biden to use it for a campaign ad.

Awards and nominations

Popular culture
 In January 2003, ABC Radio Grandstand commentator Kerry O'Keeffe recited the chorus of the song on-air as cricketer Steve Waugh headed towards his famous last-ball century at the Sydney Cricket Ground Test match.
 In February 2003, American comedian Dave Chappelle made a skit on Chappelle's Show parodying 8 Mile and "Lose Yourself" whereby he is on stage telling cliched jokes and constantly repeating the words "spaghetti" and "jokes" before screaming "8 Mile!".
 In the 2003 Rugby World Cup Final, the England national rugby union team listened to the track in the changing rooms as inspiration to their first rugby world cup win, and the song was also used by the English Rugby Union during the tournament to advertise the sport and the tournament itself.
 In 2003, Kevin Randleman used this as his entrance song at Pride Final Conflict 2003.
 In 2003, a part of the tune of the song is used as the theme music on the German detective series Lenßen & Partner.
 In 2004, in the South Park episode "You Got F'd in the A", right after Stan's conversation with his dad in the hospital, a variation of the song can be heard in the background.
 In 2005–2006, Queen + Paul Rodgers (a collaboration between the band and the singer) used the song as the house music for all of the concerts on their Queen + Paul Rodgers Tour. When the song cut out, the concert would begin with Paul Rodgers singing the opening lines of Reaching Out by Rock Therapy (featuring Rogers and Queen guitarist Brian May), before launching into the first full song. A live recording of this was later used by Eminem as a sample for his 2009 track "Beautiful".
 On May 15, 2006, Jodie Foster quoted the chorus of the song in her commencement speech at the University of Pennsylvania.
 In 2007, the teen drama series Instant Star named its season premiere episode after this song.
 In 2009, the character Jeffrey Barnes in the TV show Chuck, quoted the opening lines of the song on YouTube in the episode, "Chuck Versus the Best Friend."
 In 2009, "Lose Yourself" was often used as the pre-game song at University of Southern California home games.
 In 2009, George Sotiropoulos used this as his entrance song at UFC 101.
 In 2009, Mostapha Al-turk used this as his entrance song at UFC 99.
 In 2009, pro wrestlers Teddy Hart and Jack Evans used this as his entrance song in AAA.
 The 2010 video game DJ Hero 2 added the song as DLC as part of the Jay-Z vs. Eminem Mix Pack, mixing the song with Jay-Z's "Can I Get A..."
 On February 6, 2011, Chrysler premiered a 2-minute television commercial for the Chrysler 200 mid-size sedan, with an instrumental track of "Lose Yourself" playing in the background. Eminem appears in the commercial, which first aired on Fox during Super Bowl XLV.
 In 2012, an instrumental version of the song is sometimes played before kick off or during half time at Nottingham Forest F.C. and Millwall F.C.
 In 2012, Leicester Tigers played the song before their matches.
 In 2012, North Dakota Fighting Sioux men's ice hockey team uses the song during game time when the visiting team scores a goal.
 The 2015 episode "Nashville" of Master of None begins with a discussion between characters Dev and Arnold about whether the song is written from the perspective of B-Rabbit or Eminem
 The rollercoaster Bizarro at Six Flags New England has a soundtrack that is played during the ride, part of which features the song.
 The song was lip-synched by the character Jay Brown in EastEnders.
In September 2021, Eminem and Union Joints opened Mom's Spaghetti - a restaurant in Detroit, which is a reference to the song 
 The science fantasy novel Harrow the Ninth by Tamsyn Muir features a character whose full name is Awake Remembrance of These Valiant Dead Kia Hua Ko Te Pai Snap Back to Reality Oops There Goes Gravity.
 In 2022, Eminem performed the opening, first verse, and chorus of the song with Anderson .Paak on the drums at the halftime show of Super Bowl LVI.
 In 2022, some lyrics of the song was used for the trailer of the movie, Minions: The Rise of Gru.

Covers and alternate versions
 Children's singer Charlotte Diamond covered the song in a remix she called "Mom's Pasketti".
 "Weird Al" Yankovic made a parody of the song, titled "Couch Potato", on his 2003 album Poodle Hat. Though Yankovic was denied permission to film a music video, Eminem did allow him to record a parody of the song.
 Irish pop rock band The Script did an alternative cover to this song in the BBC Radio's live lounge.
 In 2003, the Australian comedy duo Scared Weird Little Guys produced a rap version of the folk song "Waltzing Matilda" called "Cleanin' Out My Tuckerbag", which parodies both "Lose Yourself" and "Cleanin' Out My Closet", but does not credit Eminem.
 Christian parody band ApologetiX parodied the song as "Look Yourself". It is available on their 2003 album, Adam Up.
 The show Robot Chicken parodied part of the song in the rapping sequence involving Bugs Bunny and a collection of other Looney Tunes characters.
 Canadian rock band Three Days Grace have been covering "Lose Yourself" in a medley with their song "Home". One at least one occasion, the band covered "Lose Yourself" with their song "Chalk Outline."
 During the farewell concert, Polish hip hop group Paktofonika performed their song "W moich kręgach" ("In My Circles") with music background from "Lose Yourself".
 Post hardcore band Serianna covered this song in 2012, which is available as a digital download on iTunes and Amazon.
 Kelly Clarkson covered this song during her Clarkston, MI show on August 10, 2012, as part of her fan request cover song.
 Canadian jazz singer Kellylee Evans recorded the song on her 2013 album I Remember When and regularly performs it live.
 American rapper Machine Gun Kelly, who named Eminem as a major influence, covered the song routinely on his first tour, even performing the song along with parts of the movie at The Shelter at Saint Andrew's Hall.
 American rapper Lupe Fiasco freestyled over the beat of "Lose Yourself" on "Lu Myself", from his 2006 mixtape Touch The Sky. (Despite a reference to it on Genius.com, Lupe Fiasco does not seem to have released any mixtape titled "Lupe the Jedi".) 
 American rapper Fabolous recorded a freestyle version.
 Jon Connor's 2012 mixtape The People's Rapper LP included a remix of the song, as well as other Eminem remixes.
 Hudson Taylor covered the song as a part of their "Lose Yourself Walking on the Flume" (The Police - "Walking on the Moon", Bon Iver - "Flume") mashup.
 A mashup of this song with German artist Nena's "Nur geträumt", created by HiFi Brown, was a German radio hit in 2003.
 Vienna Teng covers the song in live performance as a mashup along with Bill Withers' "Ain't No Sunshine".
 German Alternative Rock band Guano Apes covers the song on the 20-year-anniversary edition of their first album Proud Like a God, Proud Like a God XX.
 Saliva released a cover of the song online on September 22, 2017.
 American country singer Taylor Swift covered song a number of times while on tour. She covered the song acoustically numerous times on the radio as well including radio station KEEY-FM.
 The East Village Opera Company performed this song live in the past, usually as an encore with full orchestra backing.

Track listing

Notes
 signifies an additional producer.

Credits and personnel
Credits for "Lose Yourself" are adapted from the liner notes of the original soundtrack to the movie 8 Mile.

Recording
 Recorded at: Detroit, Michigan

Personnel
 Eminem – vocals, audio mixing, producer, songwriting and drum programming
 Jeff Bass – additional production, songwriter, electric guitar, bass, piano and keyboards
 Steve King – audio mixing and recording
 Mike Strange – recording
 Luis Resto – songwriter, keyboards and programming

Charts

Weekly charts

Year-end charts

Decade-end charts

All-time charts

Certifications

See also

 Academy Award for Best Original Song
 Eight Mile Style v New Zealand National Party
 Grammy Award for Best Rap Song
 Grammy Award for Best Rap Solo Performance
 List of best-selling singles
 List of best-selling singles in the United States
 List of best-selling singles in Australia
 List of number-one singles in Australia in 2002
 List of number-one singles of 2002 (Ireland)
 List of number-one hits of 2002 (Italy)
 List of number-one singles from the 2000s (UK)
 List of Hot 100 number-one singles of 2002 (U.S.)
 List of number-one hits of 2003 (Austria)
 List of number-one hits in Denmark
 List of Dutch Top 40 number-one singles of 2003
 List of European number-one hits of 2003
 List of number-one singles from the 2000s (New Zealand)
 List of number-one hits in Norway
 List of number-one hits of 2003 (Sweden)
 List of number-one hits of 2003 (Switzerland)
 List of number-one hits of 2002 (Romania)
 Ultratop 50 number-one hits of 2003
 Ultratop 40 number-one hits of 2003

References

External links 
 

2002 singles
2002 songs
2000s ballads
Eminem songs
Best Original Song Academy Award-winning songs
Billboard Hot 100 number-one singles
Number-one singles in Australia
Number-one singles in Austria
Number-one singles in Denmark
European Hot 100 Singles number-one singles
Number-one singles in Finland
Number-one singles in Greece
Number-one singles in Hungary
Irish Singles Chart number-one singles
Number-one singles in Italy
Dutch Top 40 number-one singles
Number-one singles in New Zealand
Number-one singles in Norway
Number-one singles in Portugal
Number-one singles in Switzerland
Number-one singles in Sweden
UK Singles Chart number-one singles
Songs written by Eminem
Song recordings produced by Eminem
Grammy Award for Best Male Rap Solo Performance
Shady Records singles
Aftermath Entertainment singles
Interscope Records singles
Songs written by Luis Resto (musician)
Songs written by Jeff Bass
Rap rock songs
Songs about fictional male characters
Hardcore hip hop songs